The 1930–31 Northwestern Wildcats men's basketball team represented Northwestern University during the 1930–31 NCAA men's basketball season in the United States. The head coach was Dutch Lonborg, coaching in his fourth season with the Wildcats. The team finished the season with a 16–1 record and was retroactively named the national champion by the Helms Athletic Foundation and the Premo-Porretta Power Poll.

Schedule and results

|-
!colspan=9| Regular season

Source

Individual honors
Joe Reiff – Consensus All-American

References

Northwestern Wildcats men's basketball seasons
Northwestern
NCAA Division I men's basketball tournament championship seasons
Northwestern Wildcats Men's Basketball Team
Northwestern Wildcats Men's Basketball Team